Thin Mints may refer to:

 Haviland Thin Mints, a chocolate-covered mint candy produced by the Haviland division of Necco
 Thin Mints (Girl Scout Cookie)